Catherine Lobé  (previously Guetta; born 27 March 1967) is a Senegalese-born French former nightclub manager, events organizer and socialite. She is the ex-wife of DJ and music producer David Guetta.

Early life and career 

Cathy Lobé was born in Dakar, Senegal, on 27 March 1967. Her father was in the army and originally from Cameroon, and her mother was French. She spent her childhood in Toulon, as well as in Senegal. Shortly after moving from Senegal to France, she became the manager of a nightclub and organized Parisian parties.

In 1992, she met and married David Guetta. They have two children: son Tim Elvis Eric (born 9 February 2004) and daughter Angie Guetta (born 23 September 2007). After twenty-two years of marriage, the Guettas were granted a divorce by a Paris court in March 2014.

In 2003, she and her then-husband opened a night venue called Le Sweet Bar. She also ran a Moroccan restaurant in Paris, Le Tanjia, and was artistic director for the disco, Les Bains Douches. She is also a business partner of Muratt Atik at Pink Paradise, a strip nightclub, and the restaurant, La Poope. She also organizes events in many locations, notably in Cannes and Marrakech. Since 1996, she has been organizing special nights with David Guetta in Ibiza, the Spanish island renowned for its nightlife. The results of her collaboration are joint albums called the "Fuck Me I'm Famous" series, released as Cathy and David Guetta. She also organizes annual events called Unighted by Cathy Guetta, inviting well-known international DJs. She hosted and conducted the event at the national stadium in Saint-Denis near Paris, the Stade de France in 2008 and 2009, then moved the event to Nice in 2010 at the Stade Charles-Ehrmann.

She has also taken on acting roles. In 1999 she debuted in Quasimodo d'El Paris, a film directed by Patrick Timsit. She also appeared alongside Romain Duris and Jean-Paul Belmondo in Peut-être and in 2002, as Fred in 3 zéros, a film by Fabien Onteniente. She has appeared in a number of music videos, notably in "Sexy Chick" by David Guetta and Akon in 2009 and in "The Alphabeat" with David Guetta in 2012.

In 2008 Cathy Guetta published her autobiography, Bains de Nuit.

Discography

Albums 

 Fuck Me I'm Famous series

 Unighted by Cathy Guetta series

Filmography 

 1999: Quasimodo d'El Paris as a prostitute
 1999: Peut-être as a DJ
 2000: Jet Set as Mercedes
 2001: Would I Lie to You 2 (original French title La vérité si je mens! 2) as Isabelle
 2001: Sa mère, la pute as Ebène (TV series)
 2002: Shooting Stars as Fred
 2012: Nothing But The Beat as herself
 2019: Ibiza as Cathy

Bibliography 
 2008: Bains de nuit - Cathy Guetta, Clara Dupont-Monod, Publisher: Fayard (in French),

References

External links 
 
 Cathy Guetta at Instagram

1967 births
Living people
Businesspeople from Toulon
Naturalized citizens of France
Senegalese emigrants to France
Senegalese people of Cameroonian descent
21st-century French businesswomen
21st-century French businesspeople
French film actresses
People from Dakar
Actors from Toulon